Jonas Ried (born 18 December 2004) is a German racing driver currently competing in the European Le Mans Series for Proton Competition.

He is the son of FIA World Endurance Championship driver and Proton Competition team owner Christian Ried.

Early career

Karting 
Having finished second in the Bavarian-based Kart Trophy Weiß-Blau in 2014, Ried began karting at a national level the following year, taking part in the ADAC Kart Masters in the Bambini class. Parallel to that, he would also compete in the South German ADAC Kart Cup, finishing third in 2016, whilst also becoming runner-up in the ADAC Kart Bundesendlauf during his first year of OK Junior karting in 2017. Ried would remain in karting until 2020, where he made a first foray into gearbox karts.

Lower formulae

2021 
Ried progressed into single-seaters in 2021, racing for BWT Mücke Motorsport in the Formula 4 UAE Championship at the start of the year. There he would take his first podiums in car racing, one at Yas Island and Dubai respectively, and finished ninth in the standings.

That season, the German would compete full-time in the Italian F4 Championship with the same team, partnering Joshua Dürksen and Erick Zúñiga. His best finish came during Race 1 in Misano, where he also took the fastest lap, and another points finish the race before at Le Castellet meant that Ried ended up 23rd overall.

2022 
Having begun the 2022 season by racing in the F4 UAE Championship during the winter, Ried teamed up with Taylor Barnard and Niktia Bedrin for a season in Italian and ADAC F4 with new team PHM Racing. Ried would experience a challenging campaign in the former, managing to score points on just one occasion in Monza, whereas the season in Germany proved to bear more fruit, with Ried taking points in all but four races, which meant he took ninth in the drivers' standings.

Sportscar career 
In 2023, Ried would make a switch to endurance racing, first driving for Rinaldi Racing in the LMP3 class of the Asian Le Mans Series, before joining his father's team, Proton Competition, for a season in the European Le Mans Series as part of the LMP2 category. The campaign in Asia started off promisingly, as Ried, Matthias Lüthen and Lorcan Hanafin finished Race 1 at Dubai in fourth place, however three subsequent, successive retirements caused by reliability issues and a collision in the final race meant that the trio ended up twelfth in the drivers' standings.

Karting record

Karting career summary 

† As Ried was a guest driver, he was ineligible to be classified in the standings.

Complete CIK-FIA Karting European Championship results 
(key) (Races in bold indicate pole position) (Races in italics indicate fastest lap)

† As Ried was a guest driver, he was ineligible to be classified in the standings.

Racing record

Racing career summary 

* Season still in progress.

Complete F4 UAE Championship results 
(key) (Races in bold indicate pole position) (Races in italics indicate fastest lap)

Complete Italian F4 Championship results 
(key) (Races in bold indicate pole position) (Races in italics indicate fastest lap)

Complete ADAC Formula 4 Championship results 
(key) (Races in bold indicate pole position) (Races in italics indicate fastest lap)

Complete Asian Le Mans Series results 
(key) (Races in bold indicate pole position) (Races in italics indicate fastest lap)

Complete European Le Mans Series results
(key) (Races in bold indicate pole position; results in italics indicate fastest lap)

References

External links 

 

2004 births
Living people
German racing drivers
Racing drivers from Baden-Württemberg
People from Ehingen
Italian F4 Championship drivers
UAE F4 Championship drivers
ADAC Formula 4 drivers
Spanish F4 Championship drivers
Asian Le Mans Series drivers
European Le Mans Series drivers
Mücke Motorsport drivers
PHM Racing drivers
Van Amersfoort Racing drivers